The commemorative coins of Italy are minted by the Istituto Poligrafico e Zecca dello Stato (IPZS) in Roma.

10 euros  silver
15 euros  silver
20 euros  gold
50 euros  gold

€2 - bi-metallic
2004 - World Food
2005 - European Constitution
2006 - The Winter Olympics in Torino

€10 coins
2003 - Italian's Presidency of the E.U. 
2004 - Genoa, European capital of culture

€15 coins
2003 - Dittico Europa Dei Popoli 
2004 - Giacomo Puccini - the centenary of Madam Butterfly 
2005 - Olympic Games 2006 Torino - Second mint : ski et ice-hockey.

€20 coins
2004 - Europe and arts - Belgium : René Magritte
2005 - Olympic Games 2006 Torino - First mint : Porte Palatine in Torino
2005 - Olympic Games 2006 Torino - Second mint : Palazzo Madama in Torino

€50 coins
2003 - Europe and arts - Austria 
2004 - Europe and arts - Denmark

References

Italy
Coins of Italy